Salaam, Paris is a novel written by Kavita Daswani, who is a columnist for Women's Wear Daily.

Plot
The novel is based on a story of a Muslim girl named Tanaya Shah; a young Indian girl mesmerized by western culture. She was raised by her mother and grandfather, as her father abandoned Tanaya's mother when Tanaya was a young child. Tanaya's grandfather treated Tanaya with the utmost respect. He treated her like his own daughter, but Tanaya still felt that she was neglected.

Because Tanaya's mother was abandoned, Tanaya's grandfather (Tanaya's mother's father) would remain extremely cautious of Tanaya's roundabouts. This became difficult for Tanaya, as she wanted to explore the world outside of Mahim; place she Tanaya was born and raised. Adding to this, Tanaya was born in a family where women had the best facial features. This was true for all women in her family, except for her mother. As the story progresses, we learn that Tanaya's mother was thought to have been abandoned because of this lacking feature. Unfortunately, Tanaya's mother was well aware of this fact, and thus hated Tanaya. Over the years, her mother had become sarcastic and cruel towards Tanaya. This was one of the reasons that Tanaya was more attached to her grandfather.

Getting back to Tanaya's fantasy of the western culture; like every young girl, Tanaya was also amazed by the glossy magazines that portrayed women in a stylish way. Tanaya with her best friend, Nilu, would read all western magazines, especially, Teen Cosmo. In private conversations with Nilu, she would often confide about leaving Mahim to Paris. She wanted to become like one of the models. However, modeling was not her passion. All she wanted was freedom, and a new change in her life.

Her grandfather saw it a bit differently. He attested this new change with her married life. Call it a fortunate event, but Tanaya received a proposal. He happened to be the son of Tanaya's grandfather's friend. His name was Tariq Khan, who happened to live in Paris. Tanaya saw this as an opportunity to see Paris.

Fate of luck strikes, and her grandfather allows her to visit Paris, where she became part of the modeling industry. (The book has a detailed account of the difficulties she faces to become a model).

In the end, Tanaya finally marries Tariq Khan, and realizes that she was pursuing rather a mere image of herself.

Reception
Booklist called it "an engaging and sweet tale".

References

External links
 Author's website

Reviews
 Library Journal, by  Shirley N. Quan
 Kirkus Reviews
 USA Today

Novels by Kavita Daswani
Novels set in India
Novels set in Paris
2006 American novels
Indian diaspora in fiction